The Weeks Estate is a historic country estate on U.S. Route 3 in Lancaster, New Hampshire. Built in 1912 for John Wingate Weeks, atop Prospect Mountain overlooking the Connecticut River, it is one of the state's best preserved early 20th-century country estates. It was given to the state by Weeks' children, and is now Weeks State Park. It features hiking trails, expansive views of the countryside from the stone observation tower, and a small museum in the main estate house. A small portion of property at the mountain summit was listed on the National Register of Historic Places in 1985.

Setting
The former Weeks Estate occupies a  parcel south of Lancaster's town center, on the east side of Route 3. Most of the park consists of woods, with cleared scenic pullouts on Route 3, and the intermittently operated Mount Prospect Ski Tow, a small ski area on the western slope of the mountain. There are parking pullouts at several points along the auto road, from which there are views of the Connecticut River and the White Mountains.

Estate buildings
The estate complex at the summit of Prospect Mountain includes the main house, a carriage house, a stone tower, and servants' quarters. The main house is a two-story frame structure, finished in stucco in an eclectic combination of the Tudor and Spanish Mediterranean Revivals. It is covered by a clipped gable roof of red tile, and has half-timbering in the English country style. This styling is continued in the carriage house and servants' quarters, although their roofs are asphalt shingle. The circular stone tower, originally fitted with a central water storage tank, is open to the public, and provides expansive 360° views of the countryside. The main house has a museum with displays on the history of the Weeks family and the involvement of Weeks in the early 20th-century conservation movement.

History
John Wingate Weeks, U.S. Representative from Massachusetts and a Lancaster native, began purchasing land on Prospect Mountain, near the historic family lands. The auto road was built in 1912, as was the main house. Weeks was a driving force in the passage of the Weeks Act in 1911, allowing for the establishment of national forests in the eastern United States, including the White Mountain National Forest, visible from the summit area. Weeks went on to serve as United States Secretary of War in the 1920s. This property was given to the state of New Hampshire in 1941 by Weeks' children, and the summit area was listed on the National Register of Historic Places in 1985.

See also

National Register of Historic Places listings in Coos County, New Hampshire

References

External links

Weeks State Park New Hampshire Department of Natural and Cultural Resources
Weeks State Park Map New Hampshire Department of Natural and Cultural Resources

Houses on the National Register of Historic Places in New Hampshire
Houses completed in 1912
State parks of New Hampshire
Museums in Coös County, New Hampshire
Historic house museums in New Hampshire
Parks in Coös County, New Hampshire
Houses in Coös County, New Hampshire
1912 establishments in New Hampshire
National Register of Historic Places in Coös County, New Hampshire
Lancaster, New Hampshire